Roode Steen, also known as Kaasmarkt, is a square and a road junction in the city center of Hoorn, Netherlands.

The Westfries Museum and the weigh house (Waag) are both located on the Roode Steen. A statue of Jan Pieterszoon Coen, made by Ferdinand Leenhoff, was placed on the square in 1893.

Road junction 
Roode Steen is the meeting point of four streets and two alleys. Clockwise from the northwest, these are:
 Grote Noord
 Kerkstraat
 Grote Oost
 Grote Havensteeg
 West
 Proostensteeg

See also 
 Nieuwmarkt

References 

Hoorn
Squares in the Netherlands